Stricture may refer to:

 stricture (medicine), a narrowing of a tubular structure,.
 esophageal stricture, in medicine
 a feature of the Perl programming language
 tenet, in religion
 degree of contact, in a consonant